Traytown is a town in central Newfoundland, Newfoundland and Labrador, Canada. It is in Division No. 7 on Alexander Bay. Residents of Traytown seek services mainly in the town of Glovertown. Traytown does, however, have its own municipal council and businesses which include the Border Lounge, Whop-D-Doo Hair, K&K Ready Mix and many others. The community also has an outdoor rink and community playground which is maintained by town council as well as its volunteers.  The name Traytown came from a surveyor that visited Traytown in the late 19th century.  He thought that the landscape resembled a maze and named the town Troytown.  This eventually was changed to Traytown over the years.

Demographics 

References

See also
 List of cities and towns in Newfoundland and Labrador

Populated coastal places in Canada
Towns in Newfoundland and Labrador